Johann Christian Ernst Bareuther (19 January 1838 in Asch, Austria-Hungary – 17 August 1905 in Freiburg im Breisgau) was a Bohemian-Austrian politician.

Bareuther was born the son of Johann Christian Bareuther, a cloth manufacturer, and Sophia (née Just), daughter of Upper pastor Karl August Just of Asch. The sock manufacturer Johann Christian Wunderlich was his godfather. He studied in Prague and became a lawyer. In 1871, he joined the Czech national parliament and, in 1873, the Austrian Imperial Council. He was a co-founder of the Union of Germans in Bohemia. From 1882 to 1885, he was also a member of the Vienna City Council. He was a member of the Protestant community in Vienna and leader of Away from Rome!. Bareuther was an honorary member of Burschenschaft Teutonia Prag. From 1898 he was a member of Georg Ritter von Schönerer's pan-German Movement. He died in Freiburg, and was buried in his home town of Asch.

Literature
 Helge Dvorak: Biografisches Lexikon der Deutschen Burschenschaft. Band I Politiker, Teilband 1: A-E. Heidelberg 1996, S. 50. (mit Bild)

References

External links
 

1838 births
1905 deaths
People from Aš
People from the Kingdom of Bohemia
German Bohemian people
Constitutional Party (Austria) politicians
Members of the Austrian House of Deputies (1873–1879)
Members of the Austrian House of Deputies (1879–1885)
Members of the Austrian House of Deputies (1885–1891)
Members of the Austrian House of Deputies (1891–1897)
Members of the Austrian House of Deputies (1897–1900)
Members of the Austrian House of Deputies (1901–1907)
Members of the Bohemian Diet